Carlota Cove is the 1.9 km wide cove indenting for 1.14 km the northwest coast of Alfatar Peninsula, Robert Island in the South Shetland Islands, Antarctica next east of Coppermine Peninsula, and entered between Fort William and Misnomer Point.  The area was visited by early 19th century sealers operating from neighbouring Clothier Harbour.

The feature was surveyed and named by the 1949 Chilean Antarctic Expedition under Captain Leopoldo Fontaine.

Location

See also
 Alfatar Peninsula
 Robert Island

Map
 L.L. Ivanov. Antarctica: Livingston Island and Greenwich, Robert, Snow and Smith Islands. Scale 1:120000 topographic map.  Troyan: Manfred Wörner Foundation, 2009.

References
 SCAR Composite Antarctic Gazetteer.

Coves of Robert Island